The 1st South Carolina Regiment (Infantry) was authorized on June 6, 1775, at Charleston, South Carolina, for service with the South Carolina State Troops. On November 4, 1775, the unit was adopted into the Continental Army and on February 27, 1776 was assigned to the Southern Department. The regiment saw action at the Siege of Savannah and the Siege of Charleston. The British Army captured the regiment at Charleston on May 12, 1780, together with the rest of the Southern Department.

Officers
 Lt Col Isaac Huger (original officer)
 Col. Christopher Gadsden
 Col. Charles Cotesworth Pinckney

History
The unit timeline includes the following events:
 June 6, 1775, authorized by as South Carolina State Troops
 Summer of 1775, organized in Charleston, South Carolina to include 10 companies from eastern South Carolina
 November 4, 1775, adopted into the Continental Army
 February 27, 1776, assigned to the Southern Department
 November 23, 1776, assigned to the 1st South Carolina Brigade of the Southern Department
 January 3, 1779, relieved from the 1st South Carolina Brigade
 February 1, 1779, assigned to the South Carolina Brigade of the Southern Department
 February 11, 1780, consolidated with the 5th South Carolina Regiment
 May 12, 1780, captured by the British Army in the Siege of Charleston
 December 11, 1782, reorganized at Charleston to consist of three companies
 May 1-14, 1783, furloughed at Charleston
 November 15, 1783, disbanded

Engagements
The unit was involved in the following battles, skirmishes and sieges:
 July 9, 1775, Bloody Point
 September 15, 1775, Fort Johnson
 November 11–12, 1775, Hog Island Channel
 June 28, 1776, Fort Moultrie/Sullivan's Island
 March 7, 1778, Battle of Barbados
 February 3, 1779, Battle of Beaufort/Port Royal Island
 March 3, 1779, Battle of Briar/Brier Creek, Georgia
 May 1779, Prevost's March on Charleston
 June 20, 1779, Battle of Stono Ferry
 September 16 – October 18, 1779, Siege of Savannah, Georgia
 March 28 – May 12, 1780, Siege of Charleston
 March 29–30, 1780, Gibbes' Plantation
 April 8, 1780, Sullivan's Island
 April 12, 1780, Sullivan's Island
 April 25, 1780, Sullivan's Island
 May 2, 1780, Haddrell's Point
 May 7, 1780, Fort Moultrie

See also
 South Carolina Line: 1st, 2nd, 3rd, 4th, 5th, 6th Regiments
 List of South Carolina militia units in the American Revolution
 Southern theater of the American Revolutionary War

References

Bibliography of the Continental Army in South Carolina compiled by the United States Army Center of Military History

1st South Carolina Regiment